Rafael López Gómez (born 9 April 1985), commonly known as Rafa, is a Spanish professional footballer who plays mainly as a central defender.

Club career
Rafa was born in Peñafiel, Province of Valladolid, Castile and León. A product of Real Valladolid's youth system, he made his debut with the first team on 8 February 2004 in a 0–2 away defeat against RCD Espanyol, but only managed, however, six appearances with the main squad over his first two professional seasons.

After a season-long loan at SD Eibar in the second division, Rafa returned to help Valladolid regain their La Liga status in 2007. He played 21 league matches in the following campaign.

Rafa agreed to join Getafe CF on a Bosman transfer in early July 2008. He would spend most of his first year as left back, replacing out-of-form Lucas Licht who was sold shortly after.

In 2009–10, benefitting from consecutive injuries to Mario, Rafa was mostly first-choice. With 27 games and two goals from the player, the Madrid team finished sixth and qualified to the UEFA Europa League for the second time in their history.

On 1 September 2014, the last open day of the transfer window, Rafa transferred to newly promoted German Bundesliga club SC Paderborn 07, signing a two-year contract. He made his league debut on 22 November, playing the full 90 minutes in a 2–2 home draw against Borussia Dortmund.

Rafa returned to his first club Valladolid on 13 July 2016, after agreeing to a three-year deal. The following 17 June, he left.

On 23 August 2017, 32-year-old Rafa signed for Indian Super League franchise FC Pune City. He returned to Spain and its second division the following 7 July, after joining CF Rayo Majadahonda on a one-year contract.

Club statistics

References

External links

1985 births
Living people
Sportspeople from the Province of Valladolid
Spanish footballers
Footballers from Castile and León
Association football defenders
La Liga players
Segunda División players
Segunda División B players
Tercera División players
Real Valladolid Promesas players
Real Valladolid players
SD Eibar footballers
Getafe CF footballers
CF Rayo Majadahonda players
Bundesliga players
2. Bundesliga players
SC Paderborn 07 players
Indian Super League players
FC Pune City players
Hyderabad FC players
Spanish expatriate footballers
Expatriate footballers in Germany
Expatriate footballers in India
Spanish expatriate sportspeople in Germany
Spanish expatriate sportspeople in India